Letterheads Australia is a group of signwriters and decorative artists dedicated to preserving and passing down traditional sign making skills. The Letterheads meet at least annually for a weekend event to practise and exchange accumulated techniques and skills of the craft.

History 
The  Letterheads movement originated in the US in the 1970s and has since spread to a number of countries including Australia, New Zealand, Canada, The UK, The Netherlands and Norway.

From original article Letterheads: "Originated in Denver, Colorado in 1975 by a group of sign shop apprentices and sign artists; Rick Flores, John Frazier, Bob Mitchell, Mark Oatis, Mike Rielly, Earl Vehill, Mike Author, Joe Tedesco, Jim Schultz. and Noel Weber. The term "Letterheads" was coined by Earl Vehill. All were unified by an interest in sign design principles and techniques which were no longer taught or valued by most of the contemporary classes, or by the shops in which they worked. Many were understudies of the talented and generous Jerry Albright, and all were acquainted with sign artist Larry Albaugh, in whose studio many early meetings were held. The early gatherings were informal, and consisted of a fair amount of partying, centered around discussions of the sign trade. Sharing, exemplified by Jerry Albright, became the strength of the group. Together with this dedication to sharing and participation was an especial focus upon books and resources, particularly sign instruction and lettering manuals dating to the early 1900s.

Throughout the 1970s, meetings were confined to Colorado but membership began to grow. Keith Knecht, out of Ohio, joined early on. Knecht, a well-known signmaker and pinstriper who began his career in 1956, died August 30, 2011, at the age of 71. Hundreds of new members joined during the early 1980s, and the movement took off from there. There was a meeting at Noel's in the summer of 1982 and then Mike Jackson's Oklahoma meet in October of the same year. Raymond Chapman had a Texas gathering in November, 1983. The composition of the seminal group, as well as the timeline of early meetings, is a matter of record within the sign industry, and can be verified by a review of letters and articles published in Signs of the Times and SignCraft magazines.

The group now has grown worldwide and numbers in the thousands. The Letterheads traditionally gather for one annual "International" meet in the US or Canada, as well as 10 or more smaller regional meets throughout, but not limited to, the US, Canada, Australia and the UK. 2005 marked the first meet held in Greece.

Meets typically last for several days, and consist of attendees participating in lettering, striping, carving, gold leafing (gilding) and often glass art. Besides the incredible amount of talent and skill demonstrated during these events, it is the free exchange of knowledge and camaraderie amongst people of the same trade that makes these weekends remarkable.

The Letterhead mission is to pass on trade "secrets" and skills through the ages, "keeping their craft alive" for future generations. With the onset of computers and vinyl films for signmaking, the Letterhead mission of passing down the traditional skills is more important today than ever before."

Annual Meetings

1994 Wagga Wagga NSW 
John Rigby hosted the event

1995 Jindabyne NSW

1996 Canberra ACT

1997 Maitland NSW

Jondaryan, Qld.

Clare Valley, SA

2013 Eugowra NSW 

The 2013 Letterheads meeting in Eugowra was held on the same weekend as the Eugowra Most Wanted Mural Meet which is also an annual event. Dozens of signwriters and artists painted murals at several outdoor locations around the township and others worked indoors on personal projects.

2014 Melbourne Vic. 

2014 Letterheads was hosted by Lindsay and Fran Thorne at the workshop of Magnum Signs in Caroline Springs. Signwriters, pinstripers and airbrush artists worked on personal projects and held a friendly contest on the pinstripe racetrack.

2015 Sunshine Coast Qld. 

Letterheads 2015 was hosted by Vick Pattison at her workshop on Queensland's Sunshine Coast.

2016 Grafton NSW 

Letterheads 2016 saw approximately 30 signpainters and pinstripers gather at the workshop of Grafton Signart. The gilding class had the largest number of participants for some years and in addition to many personal projects, the signwriters collaborated on a community project for the local Dragon Boat club.

2017 Londonderry NSW 

Letterheads 2017 will be hosted by Ray and Marlene Cosier and Peter Fishlock at the workshop of Raymar Signs in Londonderry NSW. The event will take place September 22–24.

References 

Arts organisations based in Australia
Crafts organizations